PT Hanjaya Mandala Sampoerna Tbk, commonly known as Sampoerna, is an Indonesian tobacco company owned by Philip Morris International. Sampoerna is the largest tobacco company in Indonesia. It produces clove cigarettes, otherwise locally known as kretek cigarettes. A typical brand is Sampoerna 'A' Mild, a filter cigarette in white paper.

History
In the 1930s, Liem Seeng Tee (Lin Shengdi) adopted the Indonesian name Sampoerna (in Dutch spelling, cf. sempurna) meaning "perfection" as his family name, thus becoming the company's namesake. Sampoerna began producing Dji Sam Soe in 1913 in Soerabaia, East Java. Following Seeng Tee's death in 1956, his two daughters took over the running of the company, while his two sons ran separate tobacco-related businesses. The daughters shifted the company's focus toward white cigarettes, which nearly caused bankruptcy for Sampoerna. Youngest son Liem Swie Ling, who ran a kretek factory in Bali, returned to Surabaya in 1959 to rescue the company. He shifted production back to hand-rolled Dji Sam Soe brand cigarettes. In 1968, the company launched Sampoerna A Hijau. By the mid-1970s, the company was producing over 1 million cigarettes daily and had 1,200 staff. Swie Ling in the 1970s began to hand over the running of the company to his second-eldest son, Liem Tien Pao, better known as Putera Sampoerna, who went on to modernize the company and expand its operations. In 19 October 1990, Sampoerna A Mild was launched.

In May 2005, Philip Morris International, at that time a subsidiary of Altria, completed the acquisition of 97.95% of the company. HM Sampoerna's current president is Paul Norman Janelle.

At the end of May 2014, Sampoerna closed its Lumajang and Jember factories and laid off 4,900 employees due to declining sales of hand-rolled kretek cigarette as consumers moved to buy machine-made kretek cigarettes.

In late April 2020, Sampoerna temporarily closed its factories in Rungkut, East Java after two of its labourers died of the COVID-19 pandemic. The factory's closure is unlikely to affect the company's total production as Sampoerna has cigarette factories in several other locations.

In 2010, the company was criticized for its approach to "corporate social responsibility" efforts when Mount Merapi in Central Java began erupting. The disaster relief teams which "aim to augment efforts by a stretched Indonesian government to house, clothe and feed evacuees from the volcano," were criticized for "the flashy four-wheel drive vehicles," and "the cluster of eager staffers wearing natty red and black uniforms covered with company logos."

Notable people
 

Michael Joseph Sampoerna

References

External links 
 

Tobacco companies of Indonesia
Companies based in Surabaya
Companies established in 1913
Indonesian brands
Sampoerna family
Philip Morris International
1913 establishments in the Dutch East Indies
1990 initial public offerings
2005 mergers and acquisitions
Companies listed on the Indonesia Stock Exchange